Michael Fray (3 September 1947 – 6 November 2019) was a Jamaican Olympic sprinter.  In the 1968 Mexico Olympics, he ran second leg on the 4x100 meters Jamaican relay team (with Lennox Miller, Clifton Forbes, and schoolboy Errol Stewart) which set the world record at 38.6 seconds in the preliminary heats and then broke the record with a 38.3 seconds clocking in the semi-finals. This 38.3 clocking still stands as the world record for athletes under twenty-three years old.

Fray enjoyed success with the Jamaican relay team in other competitions, including a silver medal at the 1966 British Empire and Commonwealth Games (alongside Pablo McNeil) and a gold medal at the 1966 Central American and Caribbean Games. He returned to the latter competition in 1970 and was an individual bronze medallist in the 100 m. He won a bronze medal in the 4×400 metre relay at the 1967 Pan American Games.

Running from the tight confines of lane one, he placed seventh in the finals of the 1968 Olympic 200 meters won  by Tommie Smith who is widely known for his gloved black power salute protest on the podium along with bronze medalist John Carlos. Both Smith and Carlos were banned for this protest.

In the 1972 Olympics in Munich, West Germany, Fray placed 5th. in the finals of the 100 meters which was won by Russian Valeriy Borzov.

He set a U.S. National Junior College 200 meters record in 1967 while competing for Odessa Junior College and was ranked number 10 in the world in the 200 meters in 1968 by Track & Field News magazine.

As a schoolboy, he placed fourth behind Miller in the 1965 100 yards finals and second behind Miller in the 1965 220 yards finals at the Jamaican High Schools Championships.

Michael "Mike" Fray passed away alleged suicide by hanging on November 6th, 2019. 

Jamaica will forever remember Fray for his remarkable, record-breaking achievements.

References

1947 births
2019 suicides
Jamaican male sprinters
Olympic athletes of Jamaica
Athletes (track and field) at the 1968 Summer Olympics
Athletes (track and field) at the 1972 Summer Olympics
Commonwealth Games silver medallists for Jamaica
Commonwealth Games medallists in athletics
Athletes (track and field) at the 1966 British Empire and Commonwealth Games
Pan American Games bronze medalists for Jamaica
Pan American Games medalists in athletics (track and field)
Athletes (track and field) at the 1967 Pan American Games
Athletes (track and field) at the 1975 Pan American Games
Place of birth missing
Central American and Caribbean Games gold medalists for Jamaica
Central American and Caribbean Games bronze medalists for Jamaica
Competitors at the 1966 Central American and Caribbean Games
Competitors at the 1970 Central American and Caribbean Games
Jamaican expatriates in the United States
Central American and Caribbean Games medalists in athletics
Medalists at the 1967 Pan American Games
Suicides by hanging
20th-century Jamaican people
21st-century Jamaican people
Medallists at the 1966 British Empire and Commonwealth Games